George Law may refer to:

George Henry Law (1761–1845), Anglican bishop
George Law (financier) (1806–1881)
George Law Curry (1820–1878), governor of Oregon Territory
George Law (footballer, born 1885) (1885–?), Scottish footballer
George Law (footballer, born 1912) (1912–1970), English footballer for Norwich City
George Law (cricketer) (1846–1911)
George M. Law, NASA spokesman in the 1960s
SS George Law, an 1850s steamship